Raghvendra Pratap Singh may refer to:

 Raghvendra Pratap Singh (Bihar politician)
 Raghvendra Pratap Singh (Uttar Pradesh politician)